Centre for Development, Environment and Policy ("CeDEP"), is a research and teaching centre based in the Department of Development Studies at SOAS University of London. Its teaching programmes are part of the University of London International Programmes, offering distance learning postgraduate qualifications in the subject areas of climate change, sustainability and  development. CeDEP's research covers the regions of Asia, Africa and the Middle East placing  emphasis on the need for informed professionals with inter-disciplinary skills and understanding to effectively tackle environmental issues, poverty, including their ethical, political, economic, social and technical dimensions.
The role of distance learning is highlighted within CeDEP not only as a mode of teaching in the subject areas of climate change and sustainable development, but also as a tool for development keeping in mind that CeDEP's research interests are best addressed and tackled by researchers and students placed in the physical field of their studies in various regions around the world. In addition, CeDEP hosts researchers and candidates for PhD degrees.

Background
The Centre for Development, Environment and Policy  (CeDEP) has a 27-year history of distance and online learning, and was originally part of the University of London’s Wye College, then later becoming part of Imperial College, and more recently SOAS. The Centre specialises in research into climate change, sustainable development, poverty and justice.

Study programmes
The CeDEP programmes of study are widely based on the outcome of CeDEP's research which is widely applied on a national and international level.
The following Master's programme are based on these research areas:
 MSc/PGDip/PGCert Climate Change and Development
 MSc/PGDip/PGCert Sustainable Development

Research areas
The CeDEP's academic staff undertakes research and supports international PhD students. The areas covered by research are divided into main streams:
 Climate change and sustainability policy
 Resilience and climate change adaptation 
 Low carbon energy transitions and policy 
 Agricultural development, food systems and poverty reduction
 Development of distance learning techniques and pedagogic methods

Publications
The staff members of CeDEP are widely published as well as holding positions on journal editorial boards and advisory positions. The current Director of CeDEP is Thomas Tanner.

Location

 London Russell Square Campus:
CeDEP is hosted at SOAS, within the faculty of Law and Social Sciences at the Russell Square campus. Thornhaugh Street, Russell Square, London WC1H 0XG

 Wye Campus:
Historically, CeDEP was part of Wye College. The centre, then called DLP, offered several programmes and support to distance learners, then it became part of Imperial College London upon the merger with Wye College.
Although CeDEP is considered to be a part of SOAS, the centre was hosted in Bexley House and Ian Carruthers House at the Imperial College campus in Wye, Ashford, Kent up until May 2011.

Notable alumni

 Rolph Payet: 
Rolph Antoine Payet is the serving Minister of Environment and Energy in Seychelles. Rolph is a lead author with the Intergovernmental Panel on Climate Change (IPCC), which was jointly awarded the 2007 Nobel Peace Prize, and his contribution is acknowledged.

Historical links
 Wye College 
 Imperial College

References

External links
 CeDEP
 University of London: CeDEP
 SOAS School of Oriental and African Studies: CeDEP
 IEMA Institute of Environmental Management and Assessment: CeDEP
 LIDC London International Development Centre: CeDEP

SOAS University of London
Environmental policy in the United Kingdom